The Cameroon Cycling Federation or FÉCA (in French: Fédération Camerounaise de Cyclisme) is the national governing body of cycle racing in Cameroon.

FÉCA is a member of the Confédération Africaine de Cyclisme.

External links
 Cameroon Cycling Federation official website

National members of the African Cycling Confederation
Cycle racing organizations
Cycle racing in Cameroon
Cycling